Homberg/Ruhrort/Baerl is a Stadtbezirk (borough/district) within the city of Duisburg, Germany. The population is 39 725 and the district has an area of 37.1 km² (as of December 31, 2014). It consists of the districts of Alt-Homberg, Hochheide, Baerl and Ruhrort.

The municipality was created in 1975 after the local government reform of parts of the left-bank community Rheinkamp-Baerl on the Lower Rhine and the Rhine district of Duisburg-Ruhrort.  In the municipality is the largest part of the Duisburg inland port Duisport.

References

Duisburg
City districts in Germany